Semyonovsky Island ('о. Семёновский' in Russian) was an island in the Lyakhovsky Islands subgroup of the New Siberian Islands. It was located in the southwestern area of the archipelago, in the eastern part of the Laptev Sea.

Before its disappearance, it was at 4 km2, one of the smallest islands in the archipelago. In 1945, just before it disappeared, its sea cliffs rose about 24 meters above sea level.

History
Mr. I. Lyakhov, a merchant from Yakutsk, discovered this island in 1770. He discovered it by following the tracks of an enormous herd of reindeer across frozen sea ice. Czarina Catherine II rewarded him for discovering this and another island in the New Siberian Island archipelago with the exclusive rights to collect fossil ivory from them.

Since its discovery, Semenovsky Island rapidly decreased in size until it disappeared between 1952 and the early 1960s. The area of Semyonovsky Island was 4.6 km² in 1823, 0.9 km² in 1912,  0.5 km² in 1936, and 0.2 km² in 1945. In 1950, it was only a solitary baydzharakh (thermokarst mound). By 1952, it had been eroded down into a sand bar lying just above the sea surface. When Semyonovsky Island was visited in the early 1960s, it had vanished and only a sand shoal with an average depth of 10 m and minimum depth of 0.2 m remained.

References

New Siberian Islands
Former islands of Russia
Islands of the Sakha Republic
Lyakhovsky Islands